Philip Milenkovic (born November 11, 1988) is a Swedish footballer currently playing for KSF Prespa Birlik. Philip signed with Trelleborgs FF on 1 April 2010 in Sweden. His agent was FIFA licensed Jovica Radonjić.

References

External links
 Malmö FF profile

1988 births
Living people
Swedish footballers
Swedish people of Serbian descent
Association football defenders
Malmö FF players
Trelleborgs FF players
Allsvenskan players
FK Radnički Obrenovac players
Expatriate footballers in Serbia
Serb diaspora sportspeople